is a city located on the island of Amami Ōshima, in Kagoshima Prefecture, Japan. Amami is the most populated municipality on Amami Ōshima. The most urban part of the municipality as well as the island's main port is a small city also known as Naze. As of June 2013, the city has an estimated population of 44,561 and a population density of 145 persons per km². The total area is 308.15 km².

History

The village of Naze was established on April 1, 1908. It was elevated to town status on October 1, 1922. As with all of the Amami Islands, the village came under the administration of the United States from July 1, 1946, to December 25, 1953.  It was elevated to city status on July 1, 1946.

The modern city of Amami was established on March 20, 2006, from the merger of the city of Naze, the town of Kasari, and the village of Sumiyō (both from Ōshima District).

Geography
Amami, located on the eastern and northern portion of Amami Ōshima, is bordered by the East China Sea to the north and the Pacific Ocean to the south. The Kasari area of the city is an exclave, separated from the main part of Amami by the town of Tatsugō.

Climate
Amami has a humid subtropical climate (Köppen climate classification Cfa) with long, hot, humid summers and mild winters. Precipitation is abundant throughout the year, with particularly heavy rainfall in May, June, August and September. The area is subject to frequent typhoons.

Surrounding municipalities
Tatsugō
Setouchi
Yamato
Uken

Transportation

Airport
Amami Airport

Seaport
Naze Port is a regional transportation hub, with frequent ferry service to Kagoshima, Tokyo, Kobe, and Osaka, as well as Okinawa, the other Amami islands, and Tokara Islands.

Highway
National Route 58

Points of interest
 Amami Islands Botanical Garden

Sister cities
  Nishinomiya, Hyōgo
  Nacogdoches, Texas, United States

Notable people from Amami
Kousuke Atari, musician
Kyokunankai Hiromitsu, former sumo wrestler (Real Name: Hirokazu Ken, Nihongo: 健博和, Ken Hirokazu)
Kazuhito Sakae, olympic wrestling coach and retired freestyle wrestler and Greco-Roman wrestler
Utami Hayashishita, Japanese professional wrestler

References

External links

 Amami City official website 
 Kagoshima Prefectural Visitors Bureau official website

Cities in Kagoshima Prefecture
Populated coastal places in Japan